= HD 126271 =

Star in the constellation Boötes

Observation data Epoch J2000 Equinox ICRS
- Constellation: Boötes
- Right ascension: 14^{h} 24^{m} 18.26833^{s}
- Declination: +08° 05′ 04.5531″
- Apparent magnitude (V): 6.18

Characteristics
- Evolutionary stage: red giant branch
- Spectral type: K4 III
- U−B color index: 1.24
- B−V color index: 1.18

Astrometry
Radial velocity (R_{v})	−30.8±0.8 km/s
Proper motion (μ)	RA: −120.146 mas/yr Dec.: −101.944 mas/yr
Parallax (π)	8.0968±0.0330 mas
Distance	403 ± 2 ly (123.5 ± 0.5 pc)
Absolute magnitude (M_{V})	+0.99

Details
Mass	1.4 M_{☉}
Radius	11.4 R_{☉}
Luminosity	52 L_{☉}
Surface gravity (log g)	2.3 cgs
Temperature	4,410 K
Metallicity [Fe/H]	+0.00 dex

Other designations
- BD+08°2858, HD 126271, HIP 70414, HR 5394, SAO 120436

Database references
SIMBAD	data

HD 126271 is a suspected variable star in the northern constellation of Boötes.
